Asterix Omnibus is a book series collecting the complete run of the Franco-Belgian bande dessinée comic Asterix, created by René Goscinny and Albert Uderzo. The series is available in both softcover trade paperbacks and in hardcover volumes, in conjunction with digital distribution. The publisher behind the project is Papercutz, which released the first volume of the series in July 2020.

Background 

In November 2019 it was announced that the American publisher Papercutz would take over the American licence for Asterix and that it would begin to reprint all of its stories in an Omnibus series beginning in 2020. Future volumes were said to be planned for release at a pace of four volumes per year. The first two volumes were initially planned to be released simultaneously on May 19, 2020. However, due to the 2020 COVID-19 pandemic, the release date was pushed forward to July of the same year. The first volume Asterix Omnibus Vol. 1 was finally launched for the United States market on July 14, 2020, with a print run of 20,000 hardcover copies plus an additional 50,000 softcover copies.

Format 

The Omnibus series is available in two versions: a hardcover and a softcover edition, both with identical contents. Each Omnibus contains three original Asterix albums. This choice was made by Papercutz owner Terry Nantier based on the assumption that the original European format of 48 pages per Asterix album would not work well in the United States audience, which is used to the graphic novel format, usually containing hundreds of pages per volume. The volumes are printed in full color throughout. The album covers have been redesigned and have new dimensions which are smaller than previous editions for the American market. The page count per volume averages 160 pages.

Reproduction 
Hachette, the rightsholder to Asterix, has generally opposed changes made to the artwork for this reprint, but agreed to subtle changes in some character portrayals, especially to tone down the original comics' racist depiction of African people. In August 2020, Nantier said that he continues to negotiate with Hachette on the topic of providing context about the history of racial representation in each volume.

Translation 
The text for the series has been newly translated to American English by Joe Johnson, professor of French and Spanish at Clayton State University, Georgia, directly from the original French source material, in order to make it more appropriate for an American audience. Previous versions of Asterix, distributed in the United States by Orion Books (an imprint of Hachette), used a British English translation. Nantier has stated that the new Americanized translation is expected to help attract new readers, especially younger ones.

The new translation by Johnson has been described as more streamlined and accessible than the previous translations, including simplifications such as changing the phrase "And now I declare the revels open!" to "Let the party begin!". Many of the comics' characteristic puns have been retouched in order to reach a contemporary audience, while retaining their original meanings. Additionally, sound effects have been changed to ones that are common in current comics; "Kerplonk!", used when a rock lands on the ground, has been replaced with "Thuddd". An effort to make many of the European and Latin references more understandable for American readers has also been made. Expressions and phrases in Latin are unchanged and accompanied by translations found in the page margins.

Some characters names have been changed in the new translation, the most prominent of which is the druid Getafix, now named Panoramix. Some minor characters have also been subject to changes, mainly to get the puns hidden in their names across better to the modern American audience.

Volumes

Related 

Free Comic Book Day 2020

In conjunction with the premiere of the reprint series, Papercutz participated in the Free Comic Book Day 2020 promotional campaign with a free comic issue titled Asterix Free Comic Book Day Special. Due to the 2020 COVID-19 pandemic, this issue was released on July 15, 2020, as the date of the Free Comic Book Day was changed to take place over the course of the summer, instead of the usual single day in May.

References

External links 

 Publisher website - Papercutz - Asterix

Belgian comics
Comics set in ancient Rome
Asterix
Historical fiction graphic novels
Comic book collection books
Humor comics